Lexo Gugava (born 17 August 1982 in Lentekhi) is a Georgian rugby union player who plays as a wing.

He plays for RC Lelo Tbilisi in Georgia Championship.

He had 25 caps for Georgia, from 2004 to 2012, scoring 5 tries, 25 points on aggregate.

He was called for the 2011 Rugby World Cup, playing a single game, without scoring. He had a five-week ban after a tip tackle on Argentine Felipe Contepomi in his only presence at the competition.

References

External links
Lexo Gugava International Statistics

1982 births
Living people
Rugby union players from Georgia (country)
Rugby union wings
Georgia international rugby union players